Ueki (written: 植木 lit. "planted tree") is a Japanese surname. Notable people with the surname include:

, Japanese politician and samurai
, Japanese actor, singer, comedian and musician
, Japanese karateka
, Japanese photographer
, Japanese women's footballer 
, Japanese footballer
, Japanese Go player

Japanese-language surnames